Helmuth Schwenn (27 January 1913 – 16 July 1983) was a German water polo player who competed in the 1936 Summer Olympics.

Career
Schwenningen won an Olympic silver medal in water polo in the Olympics in 1936 in Berlin. He was part of the German team that finished second in water polo tournament. There were 16 nations that fielded teams. Germany's performance in the final round, 2-2 against Hungary, 4-1 against Belgium and 8-1 over France . Hungary and Germany both had five points but Hungary won due to better target view (10/2 = 5) against Germany (14/4 = 3.5). The other players on the German team was Fritz Gunst, Josef Hauser, Alfred Kienzle, Paul Klingenburg, Heinrich Krug, Hans Schneider, Hans Schulze, Gustav Schürger and Fritz Stolze. Schwenningen played two matches during water polo tournament in Berlin.

See also
 List of Olympic medalists in water polo (men)

References

External links
 

1913 births
1983 deaths
German male water polo players
Water polo players at the 1936 Summer Olympics
Olympic water polo players of Germany
Olympic silver medalists for Germany
Olympic medalists in water polo
Medalists at the 1936 Summer Olympics